Wang Tzu-wei (Chinese: 王子維; born 27 February 1995) is a Taiwanese badminton player. He won his first international title at the 2014 New Zealand Open tournament. Wang competed at the 2017 Summer Universiade, where he won the gold medals in the men's singles and team events. He also competed at the 2018 Asian Games and 2020 Summer Olympics.

Achievements

Summer Universiade 
Men's singles

World University Championships 
Men's singles

BWF World Junior Championships 
Boys' singles

Asian Junior Championships 
Boys' singles

BWF World Tour (1 title) 
The BWF World Tour, which was announced on 19 March 2017 and implemented in 2018, is a series of elite badminton tournaments sanctioned by the Badminton World Federation (BWF). The BWF World Tour is divided into levels of World Tour Finals, Super 1000, Super 750, Super 500, Super 300 (part of the HSBC World Tour), and the BWF Tour Super 100.

Men's singles

BWF Grand Prix (2 titles, 5 runners-up) 
The BWF Grand Prix had two levels, the Grand Prix and Grand Prix Gold. It was a series of badminton tournaments sanctioned by the Badminton World Federation (BWF) and played between 2007 and 2017.

Men's singles

  BWF Grand Prix Gold tournament
  BWF Grand Prix tournament

BWF International Challenge/Series (3 runners-up) 
Men's singles

  BWF International Challenge tournament
  BWF International Series tournament
  BWF Future Series tournament

Invitation Tournament 
Mixed doubles

References

External links 
 
 

1995 births
Living people
Sportspeople from Taipei
Taiwanese male badminton players
Badminton players at the 2020 Summer Olympics
Olympic badminton players of Taiwan
Badminton players at the 2018 Asian Games
Asian Games bronze medalists for Chinese Taipei
Asian Games medalists in badminton
Medalists at the 2018 Asian Games
Universiade gold medalists for Chinese Taipei
Universiade medalists in badminton
Medalists at the 2017 Summer Universiade